Qionghai railway station is a railway station on the Hainan eastern ring high-speed railway located in Hainan, China.

External links

Railway stations in Hainan